was a Japanese singer, actress, journalist, and politician. Born in China, she made an international career in film in China, Hong Kong, Japan and the United States.

Early in her career, the Manchukuo Film Association concealed her Japanese origin and she went by the Chinese name Li Hsiang-lan, rendered in Japanese as Ri Kōran. This allowed her to represent China in Japanese propaganda movies. After the war, she appeared in Japanese movies under her real name, as well as in several English language movies under the stage name, Shirley Yamaguchi.

After becoming a journalist in the 1950s under the name , she was elected as a member of the Japanese parliament in 1974, and served for 18 years. After retiring from politics, she served as vice president of the Asian Women's Fund.

Early life

Fumio Yamaguchi was an employee of the South Manchuria Railway. From an early age, Yoshiko was exposed to Mandarin Chinese. Fumio Yamaguchi had some influential Chinese acquaintances, among whom were Li Jichun and Pan Yugui. By Chinese custom for those who became sworn brothers, they also became Yoshiko's "godfathers" (also known as "nominal fathers") and gave her two Chinese names, Li Hsiang-lan (Li Xianglan) and Pan Shuhua. ("Shu" in Shuhua and "Yoshi" in Yoshiko are written with the same Chinese character). Yoshiko later used the former name as a stage name and assumed the latter name while she was staying with the Pan family in Beijing.

As a youth Yoshiko suffered a bout of tuberculosis. In order to strengthen her breathing, the doctor recommended voice lessons. Her father initially insisted on traditional Japanese music, but Yoshiko preferred Western music and thus received her initial classical vocal education from an Italian dramatic soprano (Madame Podresov, married into White Russian nobility). She later received schooling in Beijing, polishing her Mandarin, accommodated by the Pan family. She was a coloratura soprano.

Career in China

Yoshiko made her debut as an actress and singer in the 1938 film, Honeymoon Express, by Manchuria Film Production. She was billed as Li Hsiang-lan, pronounced Ri Kōran in Japanese. The adoption of a Chinese stage name was prompted by the film company's economic and political motives — a Manchurian girl who had command over both the Japanese and Chinese languages was sought after. From this she rose to be a star and the Japan-Manchuria Goodwill Ambassadress. The head of the Manchukuo film industry, General Masahiko Amakasu, decided she was the star he was looking for: a beautiful actress fluent in both Mandarin and Japanese, who could pass as Chinese and who had an excellent singing voice. 

The Chinese actors who appeared in the Manchuria Film Production movies were never informed that she was Japanese, but they suspected she was at least half-Japanese as she always ate her meals with the Japanese actors instead of the Chinese actors, was given white rice to eat instead of the sorghum given to the Chinese, and was paid ten times more than the Chinese actors were. Though in her subsequent films she was almost exclusively billed as Li Hsiang-lan, she appeared in a few as "Yamaguchi Yoshiko".

Many of her films bore some degree of promotion of the Japanese national policy (in particular, pertaining to the Greater East Asia Co-prosperity Sphere ideology) and can be termed "National Policy Films". While promoting Manchurian interests in Tokyo, Li would meet Kenichiro Matsuoka, future television executive and son of Japanese diplomat Yōsuke Matsuoka, about whom she would write in her biography, Ri Kōran: My Half Life, to be her first love. Although she had hopes of marriage, he was still a student at Tokyo Imperial University and not interested in settling down at the time. They would meet again after the war, at which time Kenichiro attempted to rekindle the relationship, but by then, Li was already involved with the architect, Isamu Noguchi.  

The 1940 film, China Nights, also known as Shanghai Nights, by Manchuria Film Productions, is especially controversial. It is unclear whether it was a "National Policy Film" as it portrays Japanese soldiers in both a positive and negative light. Here, Li played a young woman of extreme anti-Japanese sentiment who falls in love with a Japanese man. A key turning point in the film has the young Chinese woman being slapped by the Japanese man, but instead of hatred, she reacts with gratitude. The film was met with great aversion among the Chinese audience as they believed that the Chinese female character was a sketch of debasement and inferiority. 23,000 Chinese people paid to see the film in 1943. After the war, one of her classic songs, "Suzhou Serenade", was banned in China due to its association with this film. A few years later, when confronted by angry Chinese reporters in Shanghai, Li apologized and cited as pretext her inexperienced youth at the time of filmmaking, choosing not to reveal her Japanese identity. Though her Japanese nationality was never divulged in the Chinese media until after the Sino-Japanese War, it was brought to light by the Japanese press when she performed in Japan under her assumed Chinese name and as the Japan-Manchuria Goodwill Ambassadress. Oddly enough, when she visited Japan during this period, she was criticized for being too Chinese in dress and in language. 

When she landed in Japan in 1941 for a publicity tour, dressed in a cheongsam (or qípáo) and speaking Japanese with a Mandarin accent, the customs officer asked her upon seeing she had a Japanese passport and a Japanese name, "Don't you know that we Japanese are the superior people? Aren't you ashamed to be wearing third-rate Chink clothes and speaking their language as you do?"

In 1943, Li appeared in the film Eternity. The film was shot in Shanghai, commemorating the centennial of the Opium War. The film, anti-British in nature and a collaboration between Chinese and Japanese film companies, was a hit, and Li became a national sensation. Her film songs with jazz and pop-like arrangements, such as her "Candy-Peddling Song" and "Quitting (Opium) Song", elevated her status to among the top singers in all Chinese-speaking regions in Asia overnight. Many songs recorded by Li during her Shanghai period became classics in Chinese popular music history. Other noteworthy hits include "Evening Primrose / Fragrance of the Night", "Ocean Bird", "If Only", and "Second Dream". By the 1940s, she had become one of the Seven Great Singing Stars.

United States, Canada, Hong Kong and Japan

At the end of World War II, Li was arrested in Shanghai by the Kuomintang and sentenced to death by firing squad for treason and collaboration with the Japanese. As tensions subsequently arose between the Kuomintang and the Communists, she was scheduled to be executed at a Shanghai horse track on December 8, 1945. However, before she could be executed, her parents (at the time both under arrest in Beijing) managed to produce a copy of her birth certificate, proving she was not a Chinese national after all, and have her childhood Russian friend, Lyuba Monosova Gurinets, smuggle it into Shanghai inside the head of a geisha doll.  Li was cleared of all charges (and possibly from the death penalty).

In spite of the acquittal, the Chinese judges still warned Li to leave China immediately or she would risk being lynched; and so in 1946, she resettled in Japan and launched a new acting career there under the name Yoshiko Yamaguchi, working with directors such as Akira Kurosawa. Several of her post-war films cast her in parts that dealt either directly or indirectly with her wartime persona as a bilingual and bicultural performer. For example in 1949, Shin-Toho studios produced Repatriation, an omnibus film which told four stories about the struggles of Japanese trying to return to Japan from the Soviet Union after having been taken prisoner following the defeat. The following year, Yamaguchi starred with actor Ryō Ikebe in Escape at Dawn, produced by Toho and based on the novel Shunpuden. In the book, her character was a prostitute in a military brothel, but for this film her character was rewritten as a frontline entertainer who falls into a tragic affair with a deserter (Ikebe). In 1952, Yamaguchi appeared in Woman of Shanghai, in which she reprised her pre-war persona as a Japanese woman passing for Chinese who becomes caught between the two cultures.

In the 1950s, she established her acting career as Shirley Yamaguchi in Hollywood and on Broadway (in the short-lived musical "Shangri-La") in the U.S. She married Japanese American sculptor, Isamu Noguchi, in 1951. Yamaguchi was Japanese, but as someone who had grown up in China, she felt torn between two identities and later wrote that she felt attracted to Noguchi as someone else who was torn between two identities. Li spent in Vancouver, Canada between 1953 and 1954. They divorced in 1956. She revived the Li Hsiang-lan name and appeared in several Chinese-language films made in Hong Kong. Some of her 1950s Chinese films were destroyed in a studio fire and have not been seen since their initial releases. Her Mandarin hit songs from this period include "Three Years", "Plum Blossom", "Childhood Times", "Only You", and "Heart Song" ( – a cover of "Eternally").

TV presenter and politician

She returned to Japan and after retiring from the world of film in 1958, she appeared as a hostess and anchorwoman on TV talk shows. As a result of her marriage to the Japanese diplomat Hiroshi Ōtaka, she lived for a while in Burma (modern Myanmar). They remained married until his death in 2001.

In 1969, she became the host of The Three O'Clock You (Sanji no anata) TV show on Fuji Television, reporting on the Israeli-Palestinian conflict as well as the Vietnam War. In the 1970s, Yamaguchi became very active in pro-Palestinian causes in Japan and personally favored the Palestine Liberation Organization. In 1974, she was elected to the House of Councilors (the upper House of the Japanese parliament) as a member of the Liberal Democratic Party, where she served for 18 years (three terms). She co-authored the book, Ri Kōran, Watashi no Hansei (Half My Life as Ri Kōran). She served as a Vice-President of the Asian Women's Fund. As part of the 1993 fall honors list, she was decorated with the Gold and Silver Star of the Order of the Sacred Treasure, Second Class.

Yamaguchi was considered by many Chinese in the post-World War II period to be a Japanese spy and thus a traitor to the Chinese people. This misconception was caused in part by Yamaguchi passing herself off as Chinese throughout the 1930s and 1940s. Her Japanese identity not being officially revealed until her post-war prosecution nearly led to her execution as a Chinese traitor. She had always expressed her guilt for taking part in Japanese propaganda films in the early days of her acting career. In 1949, the People's Republic of China was established by the Communist Party, and three years later, Yamaguchi's former repertoire from the Shanghai era in the 1930s and 1940s (along with all other popular music) was also denounced as Yellow music, a form of pornography. Because of this, she did not visit China for more than 50 years after the war, since she felt that the Chinese had not forgiven her. Despite her controversial past, she influenced future singers such as Teresa Teng, Fei Yu-Ching, and Winnie Wei, who covered her evergreen hits. Jacky Cheung recorded a cover of Kōji Tamaki's "" ("Ikanaide") and renamed it "Lei Hoeng Laan." (Both the original version and subsequent remake do not have any actual references to Li Hsiang-lan. The Chinese title instead refers to the unknowable quality and identity of the singer's lover.) In January 1991, a musical about her life was released in Tokyo, which generated controversy because its negative portrayal of Manchukuo upset many Japanese conservatives.

Yamaguchi was one of the first prominent Japanese citizens to acknowledge the Japanese brutality during wartime occupation. She later campaigned for greater public awareness of that part of history and advocated paying reparations to so-called comfort women, Korean women who were forced into sex slavery by the Japanese military during the war.

A recording of a 1950 concert performance in Sacramento, California, was discovered by a professor from the University of Chicago in 2012. The concert included six songs and was performed before an audience of Japanese Americans, many of whom had likely been interned during World War II. Speaking in 2012 about the concert, Yamaguchi said, "I sang with hope that I could offer consolation to the Japanese Americans, as I heard that they had gone through hardships during the war." She died at the age of 94 in Tokyo on September 7, 2014, exactly ten years after one of her fellow Seven Great Singing Stars, Gong Qiuxia.

Names
She was credited as Shirley Yamaguchi in the Hollywood movies, Japanese War Bride (1952), House of Bamboo (1955), and Navy Wife (1956). She was once nicknamed The Judy Garland of Japan.

Other names used as movie actress:
Li Hsiang-lan
Li Hsiang Lan
Ri Kōran
Li Xiang Lan
Hsiang-lan Li
Xianglan Li
Li Xianglan
Yoshiko Yamaguchi

Selected filmography
{| class="wikitable"
! Year
! Title
! Role
|-
| 1938 ||  (Mí yùe kuài chē / Honeymoon Express) || Bride
|-
|rowspan="4" | 1939 ||  (Fùguì Chūnmèng) ||
|-
|  (Yuānhún Fùchóu) ||
|-
|  (Tǐe xǔe hùi xīn) ||
|-
|  (Byakuran no uta / Song of the White Orchid) || Li Hsueh-hsiang
|-
|rowspan="4" | 1940 ||  (Toyuki / Journey to the East) ||  Liqin, a typist 
|-
|  (Shina no Yoru / China Nights) || Chinese orphan
|-
|  (Monkey King) ||  Oriental Woman
|-
|  (Nessa no Chikai / Vow in the Hot Sand)|| Li Fangmei
|-
|rowspan="2" | 1941 ||  (Kimi to boku / You and I) ||
|-
|  (Soshū no yoru / Suzhou Night) ||  
|-
|rowspan="1" | 1942 ||  (Yíng chūn hūa)  ||
|-
|rowspan="4" | 1943 ||  (Tatakai no machi / Fighting Street) ||
|-
|  (Sayon no kane / Sayon's Bell) || Sayon
|-
|  (Chikai no gassho / The Choir's Vow)  ||
|-
|  (Wàn Shì Liú Fāng / Eternity) ||
|-
|rowspan="2" | 1944 ||  (Yasen gungakutai / Military Band on the Battlefield) || Ai Ran
|-
|  (Watashi no uguisu / My Japanese Nightingale)  ||
|-
|rowspan="3" | 1948 ||  (Waga shōgai no kagayakeru hi / The Most Beautiful Day of My Life)  ||
|-
|  (Kōun no isu / Seat of Fortune) ||
|-
|  (Jōnetsu no ningyō / Mermaid of Passion) ||
|-
|rowspan="4" | 1949 ||  (Damoi / Repatriation) ||  
|-
|  (Ningen moyō / Human Patterns)  ||
|-
|  (Ryūsei / Shooting Star) ||
|-
|  (Haté shinaki jōnetsu / Passion without End) ||
|-
|rowspan="2" | 1950 ||  (Akatsuki no dasso / Escape at Dawn) || Harumi
|-
|  (Shubun / Scandal) || Miyako Saijo 西条美也子
|-
|rowspan="5" | 1952 || Japanese War Bride || Tae Shimizu
|-
|  (Muteki / Foghorn) || 
|-
|  (Sengoku burai / Sword for Hire) || Oryo
|-
|  (Shanhai no onna / Woman of Shanghai)|| Li Lili (Singer)
|-
|  (Fuun senryobune)|| 
|-
| 1953 ||  (Hōyō / The Last Embrace) || Yukiko Nogami
|-
|rowspan="2" | 1954 ||  (Doyōbi no tenshi / Sunday's Angel)|| 
|-
| The United States Steel Hour || Presento
|-
|rowspan="3" | 1955 ||  (Jīn Píng Méi) || Pan Jinlian
|-
| House of Bamboo || Mariko
|-
| The Red Skelton Hour || Guest vocalist
|-
|rowspan="2" | 1956 || Navy Wife || Akashi 
|-
| (Byaku fujin no yōren / The Legend of the White Serpent) || Madam White 
|-
|rowspan="2" | 1957 || Robert Montgomery Presents (The Enemy) || Hana
|-
| (Shénmì měirén / The Lady of Mystery)||  
|-
|rowspan="3" | 1958 ||  (Yí yè fēng líu / The Unforgettable Night) || Ge Qiuxia
|-
|  (Ankoru watto monogatari utsukushiki aishu / The Princess of Angkor Wat) || 
|-
|  (Tōkyō no kyūjitsu / A Holiday in Tokyo) || Mary Kawaguchi
|-
|}

In the media

Movies about her
Fuji Television made a TV movie, Sayonara Ri Kōran, starring Yasuko Sawaguchi in 1989 as a special project to mark the company's 30th anniversary.
A two-part TV movie, Ri Kōran, starring Aya Ueto was made in 2006. It was broadcast in Japan by TV Tokyo on February 11 and 12, 2007.
Japanese filmmaker, Hirokazu Koreeda, is planning a feature film based on her life story.

Other media
The novel, The China Lover (2008), by Ian Buruma is a fictionalized account of her life.
A Japanese musical based on her life was produced by the Shiki Theater Company.
The character, Li Kohran, from the SEGA multimedia Sakura Wars'' game franchise is named for her stage name.

References

Bibliography

External links

 – Kōji Tamaki's "" ("Ikanaide"), the theme song of Japanese 1989's TV drama "" ("Goodbye Ri Kōran") 

1920 births
2014 deaths
20th-century Japanese actresses
Japanese expatriates in China
Japanese expatriates in the United States
Female members of the House of Councillors (Japan)
Members of the House of Councillors (Japan)
Japanese actor-politicians
Japanese women pop singers
Japanese film actresses
Japanese people from Manchukuo
Japanese sopranos
Japanese television journalists
Japanese television personalities
Japanese war correspondents
Japanese women journalists
Mandarin-language singers of Japan
Politicians from Fushun
Recipients of the Order of the Sacred Treasure, 2nd class
War correspondents of the Vietnam War
Women television journalists
Women war correspondents
20th-century Japanese women politicians
20th-century Japanese politicians
20th-century Japanese women singers
20th-century Japanese singers
Pathé Records (China) artists
Pathé Records (Hong Kong) artists